Jesse Martineau is a Democratic member of the New Hampshire House of Representatives, representing the Hillsborough District 42 starting in 2016.  He formerly represented Manchester Ward 9.

Biography

Martineau is a product of Manchester's Catholic School system, having attended St. Anthony's Elementary School, St. Joseph's Junior High School, and Trinity High School. Upon completion of high school, Martineau attended the George Washington University in Washington, D.C., where he was a member of the Navy ROTC  and graduated with a B.A. in History in 2006. After a diagnosis of multiple sclerosis ended his dream of serving as an officer in the United States Navy, Martineau returned to Manchester where he taught Physical Education and American History at his old junior high school.

In 2006, Martineau was elected to the New Hampshire General Court representing Manchester's Ward 9.

In 2008, Martineau chose not to seek reelection in order to attend the Temple University School of Law in Philadelphia, where he was a member of the Temple Law Review and President of the Temple Law Democrats.  After being admitted to the New Hampshire Bar Association as well as the Massachusetts Bar Association, Martineau put his law career on hold to coach women's rugby at St. Anselm College and work in the autism program at Smyth Road School.

Martineau is the former head coach for the women's rugby at New England College in Henniker, New Hampshire, and works as an academic advisor for graduate students at Southern New Hampshire University.

On November 8, 2016, he was elected to represent  Hillsborough District 42, which consists of Manchester Wards 1, 2, and 3. He sits on the House Fish and Game and Marine Resources Committee.

He is also the host of the French Canadian Legacy Podcast.

References

External links
 New Hampshire House of Representatives profile
 Project Vote Smart - Representative Jesse Martineau (NH) profile

Year of birth missing (living people)
Living people
21st-century American politicians
Columbian College of Arts and Sciences alumni
Members of the New Hampshire House of Representatives
New England College Pilgrims
Saint Anselm Hawks
Southern New Hampshire University staff
Temple University Beasley School of Law alumni